Sulijeh (also Romanized as Sūlījeh and Sowlījeh; also known as Soolcheh and Sulujeh) is a village in Ali Sadr Rural District, Gol Tappeh District, Kabudarahang County, Hamadan Province, Iran. At the 2006 census, its population was 238, in 53 families.

References 

Populated places in Kabudarahang County